In civil engineering, stabilization is the retrofitting of platforms or foundations as constructed for the purpose of improving the bearing capacity and levelness of the supported building.
Soil failure can occur on a slope, a slope failure or landslide, or in a flat area due to liquefaction of water-saturated sand and/or mud. Generally, deep pilings or foundations must be driven into solid soil (typically hard mud or sand) or to underlying bedrock.

See also
Landslide mitigation
Foundation (engineering)

Construction